Josh Shilling (born in Martinsville, Virginia) is an American musician.  He joined the bluegrass band Mountain Heart in 2007.  Shilling's debut with Mountain Heart was at The Grand Ole Opry in January 2007. He has been noted in "American Noise".

In 2012, Shilling released his first solo album, "Letting Go", and his first Christmas solo, "The Christmas Song".

Shilling co-hosted a show, "That Just Happened", on historical WSM Radio along with band mates Jim VanCleve and Seth Taylor. The show was cancelled in 2013.

References

External links 
 Official website

1983 births
American rock pianists
American male pianists
Living people
People from Roanoke, Virginia
People from Martinsville, Virginia
People from Sumner County, Tennessee
21st-century American pianists
21st-century American male musicians